These tables compare features of multimedia container formats, most often used for storing or streaming digital video or digital audio content. To see which multimedia players support which container format, look at comparison of media players.

General information 

In many ways, derived containers are similar to those on which they are based, sometimes extending them, sometimes limiting their capabilities.

 QTFF
 ISO BMFF
 MP4
 3GPP, 3GPP2
 F4V

 MPEG-PS
 MPEG-TS
 M2TS
 VOB
 EVOB

 MCF
 Matroska
 WebM

 RIFF
 AVI
 DMF

 RM
 RMVB

Attachments (additional files, such as fonts for subtitles) are only supported in Matroska, MP4 and QTFF. M2TS supports attachments as multiple files in a specific file structure: fonts for subtitles are in .otf files in the /BDMV/AUXDATA/ directory.

Some common multimedia file formats are not completely distinct container formats. Some are containers for specific audio and video coding formats, such as WebM, a subset of Matroska. Some are combinations of common container formats and audio and video coding profiles, such as AVCHD and DivX formats. Although sometimes compared to DivX products, Xvid is neither a container format nor a video format, it is a software library that encodes video using specific coding profiles of the common MPEG-4 ASP video format. Those types of restrictions are intended to simplify the construction of multimedia recorders and players.

Video coding formats support 

Some containers only support a restricted set of video formats:
 DMF only supports MPEG-4 Visual ASP with DivX profiles.
 EVO only supports MPEG-4 AVC, MPEG-1 Video, MPEG-2 Video and VC-1.
 Ogg only supports Theora, MNG, JNG, PNG and Dirac. Firefox supports VP9 and VP8 in Ogg. VLC supports MPEG-2 Video, MPEG-4 Visual and VC-1 in Ogg.
 RMVB only supports RealVideo versions RV30, RV40 and RV60.
 WebM only supports VP9 and VP8. Support for AV1 is in development.

Audio coding formats support 

Some containers only support a restricted set of audio formats:
 DMF only supports MP3, AC-3, DTS and LPCM.
 EVO only supports MP3, AC-3, E-AC-3, DTS, MP2, MP1, DTS-HD, Dolby TrueHD, MLP and LPCM.
 Ogg only supports Opus, Vorbis, FLAC, A-law PCM, μ-law PCM, IEEE floating-point PCM, Speex and CELT. OGMtools supports MP3 and AC-3 in Ogg.
 RMVB only supports AC-3, ATRAC3, G.728, AAC-LC, HE-AAC v1, IS-54, Cook Codec, Sipro Lab, ACELP-NET and RealAudio Lossless.
 WebM only supports Opus and Vorbis.

Audio-only content can sometimes be placed in a simpler audio-only container, such as Native FLAC for FLAC and ADTS for AAC.

Subtitle formats support 

Some containers only support a restricted set of subtitle formats:
 DMF only supports XSUB.
 EVO only supports HD DVD .
 Ogg only supports Ogg Kate and CMML. SubRip can be converted losslessly to Ogg Kate. Ogg Writ is well supported in Ogg in common tools such as OGMtools and VLC, but there's no intention to turn its draft into a fully supported specification. Xiph recommends using Kate for subtitles. MicroDVD can be converted to Ogg Writ.
 RMVB only supports RealText. SMIL can be partially converted to RealText.
 WebM only supports WebVTT. SubRip can be converted losslessly to WebVTT.

Converting image subtitles to text formats is possible using third-party tools but relies on optical character recognition, which is not perfectly accurate and can at best extract basic formatting. Conversion of text to images is possible while preserving content and style. Round-trip format conversion between text formats may not be possible without losing some formatting features.

Overhead 
Multimedia containers interleave data in media streams to enable efficient playback using fewer computational resources, such as time spent reading from the storage drive, memory needed to buffer selected media streams, and time spent decoding when seeking to a different position in time. In this sense, muxing overhead is the control information added by the container to carry interleaved streams. A smaller overhead results in a smaller file when carrying the same streams with the same data. Overhead is affected by the total number of packets and by the size of stream packet headers. In high bitrate encodings, the content payload is usually large enough to make the overhead data relatively insignificant, but in low bitrate encodings, the inefficiency of the overhead can significantly affect the resulting file size if the container uses large stream packet headers or a large number of packets.

In general, Matroska requires the least overhead, followed by MP4, AVI and Ogg.

See also 

 List of codecs
 List of open-source codecs
 Enhanced podcast

Notes

References 

Video container Formats
Comparison
Video container